Povertyweed is a common name for several plants and may refer to:

Baccharis neglecta
Iva axillaris
Monolepis nuttalliana